Hollinwood is a small village in Shropshire, England.

Hollinwood lies to the south of the town of Whitchurch and is about one mile from the border with Wales.

External links 

Villages in Shropshire